Casa Santa may refer to:

 Santa Casa, Erice, populated placed in Erice, Italy
 Casa Santa Museum, public attraction of Jardin de Miramar, located in Antipolo City, east of Metro Manila.

See also 

 Basilica della Santa Casa